Domenico Maggiora (born 14 January 1955 in Quattordio) is an Italian professional football coach and a former player. Currently, he manages the Under-15 team of Juventus F.C.

A midfielder, he played eight seasons (162 games, 3 goals) in the Italian Serie A for A.S. Varese 1910, A.S. Roma and U.C. Sampdoria.

Roma fans remember him for a memorable goal he scored with a bicycle kick on 27 November 1977 in a game against Vicenza.

As he stated in a 2004 interview to Il Romanista newspaper, he always regretted leaving Roma for Sampdoria in the summer of 1982 as he missed on winning the Serie A title with Roma in the 1982–83 season after playing for them for 6 years.

Honours
Roma
 Coppa Italia winner: 1979–80, 1980–81.

1955 births
Living people
Italian footballers
Serie A players
Serie B players
S.S.D. Varese Calcio players
A.S. Roma players
U.C. Sampdoria players
Cagliari Calcio players
Catania S.S.D. players
Italian football managers
Association football midfielders